The Executive Vice President of the European Commission for An Economy that Works for People is the member of the European Commission responsible for economic and financial affairs. The position was previously titled Commissioner for Economic and Monetary Affairs and the Euro and European Vice President for the Euro and Social Dialogue from 2014 to 2019. The current Executive Vice President is Valdis Dombrovskis (EPP).

Responsibilities

The post is responsible for the European Union's economic, financial and monetary affairs, often combined with similar portfolios. This position is highly important due to the weight the European Union has economically worldwide (See: Economy of the European Union). It has grown particularly with the late 2000s recession and is now having to deal with getting the EU's public finances back into shape, as many members are breaking EU rules on budget deficits.

The DG responsible to the Commissioner is the Directorate-General for Economic and Financial Affairs, headed by Marco Buti.

There are a number of other economic-related Commissioner positions in the college:
 Industry and Entrepreneurship – Office abolished
 Internal Market – currently Thierry Breton
 Competition – currently Margrethe Vestager
 Trade – currently Phil Hogan
 Economy – currently Paolo Gentiloni
 Financial Programming and the Budget – currently Johannes Hahn
 Energy – currently Kadri Simson
 Consumer Protection – Office abolished

There have been suggestions from politicians such as Ségolène Royal that there should be an economic government for the eurozone, and at the start of the Barroso Commission Germany suggested an economic "super-commissioner" – which could see a change in this position. That idea however was dropped but the Enterprise and Industry Commissioner was strengthened in response.

In October 2011 the position gained added responsibility for the euro, particularly eurozone reform and bail outs, and was made a vice president.

List of commissioners

As Economic and Finance Commissioner, Robert Marjolin served in both Hallstein Commissions and Henning Christophersen served in all three Delors Commissions.

See also
 Economy of the European Union
 Eurozone & Euro
 European Central Bank
 European Union Budget
 OLAF
 European Court of Auditors
 Directorate-General for Economic and Financial Affairs

References

External links
 Rehn's website
 Almunia's archived website
 DG website

Eurogroup
Economic and Monetary Affairs
Commissioner Economic